IHWC is the acronym for the Ice Hockey World Championships, an annual international men's ice hockey tournament organized by the International Ice Hockey Federation (IIHF).

IHWC may also refer to:

FIRS Inline Hockey World Championships, an annual international inline hockey tournament organized by the Fédération Internationale de Roller Sports (FIRS)
IIHF Inline Hockey World Championship, an annual international inline hockey tournament organized by the International Ice Hockey Federation (IIHF)
Indoor Hockey World Cup, an annual international indoor field hockey tournament organized by the International Hockey Federation (FIH)